William Pitt Faithfull (11 October 1806 – 24 April 1896) was an Australian politician and pastoralist.

He was born at Richmond to pioneer settler William Faithfull and Susannah Pitt. He attended school until the age of fifteen, when he left to work on pastoral properties. He was granted land on the Goulburn Plains in 1827 and ran a large sheep stud; he also bred sheep at Port Phillip in the 1840s. On 20 January 1844 he married Mary Deane, with whom he had eight children. He was a member of the New South Wales Legislative Council from 1846 to 1848, and again from 1856 to 1861. Faithfull died at Springfield on the Goulburn Plains in 1896.

References

 

1806 births
1896 deaths
Members of the New South Wales Legislative Council
19th-century Australian politicians